South Guthrie is an unincorporated rural community in Montgomery County, Tennessee, immediately south of the Kentucky state line.

South Guthrie is adjacent to the city of Guthrie, Kentucky; essentially, it is the part of the Guthrie community located south of the state line. In the Jim Crow era, South Guthrie was the African-American community associated with the white city of Guthrie, with the state line forming a dividing line between the races.

The community of Guthrie was established in 1868 and experienced early growth after a railroad junction was completed in 1870. South Guthrie, which grew up alongside Guthrie, was known historically by the nicknames "Squiggtown" and  "Niggertown", the latter being a pejorative used by white residents of Guthrie.

In the early decades of the 20th century, residents of South Guthrie found industrial employment in a broom factory and a plant that made railroad ties. South Guthrie also had a small middle class of African-American professionals and benefited economically from African-American tobacco farmers in the surrounding "Black Patch" region.

South Guthrie is still predominantly black, while Guthrie is predominantly white, although the divisions are not as sharply defined as they were historically.

The building that houses the South Guthrie community center is a former Rosenwald school that was completed in 1922 and operated as a school until 1968. It is the only survivor out of 22 Rosenwald schools that once existed in Montgomery County. The Guildfield Missionary Baptist Church, also built in 1922, is listed on the National Register of Historic Places.

References

Unincorporated communities in Tennessee
Unincorporated communities in Montgomery County, Tennessee